Joshua Michael VanMeter (born March 10, 1995) is an American professional baseball left fielder and infielder in the Milwaukee Brewers organization. He previously played in MLB for the Cincinnati Reds, Arizona Diamondbacks and Pittsburgh Pirates.

Career

San Diego Padres
VanMeter graduated from Norwell High School and was selected by the San Diego Padres in the 5th round of the 2013 Major League Baseball draft. He signed with the Padres, forgoing his commitment to play college baseball at Illinois State University. He spent 2013 with the Arizona League Padres where he slashed .278/.378/.348 with ten RBIs in 44 games. In 2014, he played for the Fort Wayne TinCaps where he batted .254 with three home runs and 39 RBIs in 116 games, and in 2015, he returned to Fort Wayne but played in only 25 games due to injury. He spent 2016 with both the Lake Elsinore Storm and San Antonio Missions and compiled a combined .251 batting average with 14 home runs and 56 RBIs in 124 total games between the two teams.

Cincinnati Reds
On December 9, 2016, VanMeter was traded to the Cincinnati Reds as the player to be named later for Luis Torrens. The Reds assigned him to the Pensacola Blue Wahoos and he spent the whole 2017 season there, batting .255/.326/.352 with five home runs, 54 RBIs and 15 stolen bases in 132 games. VanMeter spent 2018 with both Pensacola and the Louisville Bats, slashing a combined .260/.337/.454 with 12 home runs and 59 RBIs in 128 total games between both teams. He returned to Louisville to begin 2019.

On May 5, 2019, VanMeter was promoted to the major leagues for the first time, and made his major league debut against the San Francisco Giants. On July 20, against the St. Louis Cardinals, he hit his first major league home run.

Arizona Diamondbacks
On August 31, 2020, VanMeter was traded alongside Stuart Fairchild in a deal with the Arizona Diamondbacks for Archie Bradley. In 12 games with the Diamondbacks, VanMeter slashed .194/.294/.333 with 1 home run and 5 RBI.

In 2021, VanMeter batted .212/.297/.354 with 6 home runs and 36 RBIs in 112 games. He was designated for assignment on March 27, 2022.

Pittsburgh Pirates
On March 31, 2022, VanMeter was traded to the Pittsburgh Pirates in exchange for Listher Sosa. 

On May 7, 2022, in a game against the Cincinnati Reds, VanMeter was used as an emergency catcher for the final inning of the 9-2 loss. He was forced into action after Roberto Pérez suffered a season-ending hamstring injury and Andrew Knapp was given his first career ejection after arguing a check swing call. On May 22, in a blowout loss against the St. Louis Cardinals, VanMeter pitched the ninth inning for the team, allowing four hits and five runs, including a pair of home runs.

On September 6, VanMeter was designated for assignment. He batted .187 with 3 home runs and 14 RBIs in 67 games.

Milwaukee Brewers
On January 9, 2023, VanMeter signed a minor league deal with the Milwaukee Brewers.

References

External links

1995 births
Living people
Baseball players from Indiana
People from Wells County, Indiana
Major League Baseball infielders
Cincinnati Reds players
Arizona Diamondbacks players
Pittsburgh Pirates players
Arizona League Padres players
Fort Wayne TinCaps players
Lake Elsinore Storm players
San Antonio Missions players
Peoria Javelinas players
Pensacola Blue Wahoos players
Louisville Bats players